Cardamine breweri is a species of cardamine known by the common name Brewer's bittercress. It is native to western North America from British Columbia to California to Colorado, where it grows in coniferous forests, particularly in wet bog habitats.

Description 
Cardamine breweri is a perennial herb growing up to about half a meter in maximum height. The leaves are oval in shape and sometimes divided into a few smaller leaflets. The mustardlike inflorescence is a raceme of many white flowers, each with four petals half a centimeter long. The fruit is an erect silique up to 3 centimeters long containing many small seeds.

References

External links
Jepson Manual Treatment - Cardamine breweri
USDA Plants Profile
Cardamine breweri - Photo gallery

breweri
Flora of the Western United States
Flora of California
Flora of the Sierra Nevada (United States)
Natural history of the Transverse Ranges